International Women's Film Festival may refer to:

Aswan International Women’s Film Festival, Egypt
Barcelona International Women's Film Festival, Spain
Beirut International Women Film Festival, Lebanon
Cairo International Women's Film Festival, Egypt
International Women's Film Festival (Australia), a 1975 film festival in multiple capital cities
International Women's Film Festival in Salé, Morocco
International Women's Film Festival in Rehovot, Israel
Mumbai Women's International Film Festival, India
Seoul International Women's Film Festival, Korea
St. John’s International Women’s Film Festival, Canada

See also
List of women's film festivals